William E. King (1885–1967) was an American lawyer and politician in Illinois. He served as a state legislator in the Illinois House of Representatives for eight years, followed by a full term as a state senator. He represented Illinois's 1st House of Representatives district.

Early life and education
He was born in 1885 in Oak Ridge, Morehouse Parish, Louisiana. His parents were Selina and John King. As a child, King attended the Coleman Academy (also known as Gibsland-Coleman High School) in Gibsland, Louisiana.

King earned his undergraduate degree at Philander-Smith College in Little Rock, Arkansas. He studied law at Howard University followed by John Marshall School of Law, where he graduated in 1915. His mentor was Oscar Stanton De Priest.

Career and life

Williams was admitted to the bar in 1916. In June 1919, married Blanche Hastings. The following year, 1920, the couple had a daughter, Blanche As a lawyer, he worked from 1919 until 1923 for the City of Chicago as assistant counsel to their corporation department. He spent two years as the assistant Illinois Attorney General from 1923 until 1925.

A member of the Republican Party, he was elected to the Illinois House of Representatives in 1925. He would serve in the House for eight years representing the 1st district. During his tenure in the House, King led successful efforts to make the Ku Klux Klan illegal in Illinois. He also served on a committee that studied the impact of the Chicago race riot of 1919.

He defeated William A. Wallace for Illinois State Senate in 1934. He served four years as Senator, failing to win re-election in 1938.

After he lost his Senate campaign, he was industrial commissioner for the State of Illinois, followed by two years as an attorney for a waste management district. In 1944, he unsuccessfully ran for United States Congress. He was a delegate for three Republican presidential conventions.

King and Blanche lived on the South Side of Chicago. They raised their niece alongside their daughter, Blanche.

Later life and legacy

King served as deacon for fifteen years at the Olivet Baptist Church. He was a member of the Elks and the Appomattox Club. He was also a freemason. He served on the board of directors for the Wabash YMCA. In the late 1960s, he remained active in local Republican party activities. He was vice chair of the Cook County Republican Central Commission and a member of the G.O.P. State Central Committee. He practiced law until his death.

King died in October 1967 at his home in Chicago. Jet and The Chicago Tribune published obituaries about him. His funeral was held at Ebenezer Missionary Baptist Church in Chicago.

See also
 List of African-American officeholders (1900–1959)

References

1885 births
Republican Party members of the Illinois House of Representatives
African-American state legislators in Illinois
John Marshall Law School (Chicago) alumni
African-American men in politics
20th-century African-American politicians
20th-century American politicians
Republican Party Illinois state senators
1967 deaths
Lawyers from Chicago
African-American lawyers
20th-century American lawyers
People from Morehouse Parish, Louisiana
Philander Smith College alumni
Politicians from Chicago
20th-century Baptists
Baptists from Illinois
Members of the Benevolent and Protective Order of Elks
American Prince Hall Freemasons
Howard University alumni